Nazarovo is the name of several inhabited localities in Russia.

Modern localities

Republic of Bashkortostan
As of 2014, two rural localities in the Republic of Bashkortostan bear this name:

Nazarovo, Baymaksky District, Republic of Bashkortostan, a village in Mukasovsky Selsoviet of Baymaksky District; 
Nazarovo, Zianchurinsky District, Republic of Bashkortostan, a village in Novochebenkinsky Selsoviet of Zianchurinsky District;

Chelyabinsk Oblast
As of 2014, one rural locality in Chelyabinsk Oblast bears this name:

Nazarovo, Chelyabinsk Oblast, a village in Selezyansky Selsoviet of Yetkulsky District;

Ivanovo Oblast
As of 2014, one rural locality in Ivanovo Oblast bears this name:

Nazarovo, Ivanovo Oblast, a village in Zavolzhsky District;

Khanty-Mansi Autonomous Okrug
As of 2014, one rural locality in Khanty-Mansi Autonomous Okrug bears this name:
Nazarovo, Khanty-Mansi Autonomous Okrug, a settlement in Kondinsky District

Kostroma Oblast
As of 2014, one rural locality in Kostroma Oblast bears this name:

Nazarovo, Kostroma Oblast, a village in Petrovskoye Settlement of Chukhlomsky District;

Krasnoyarsk Krai
As of 2014, one urban locality in Krasnoyarsk Krai bears this name:
Nazarovo, Krasnoyarsk Krai, a town; administratively incorporated as a krai town

Kurgan Oblast
As of 2014, one rural locality in Kurgan Oblast bears this name:

Nazarovo, Kurgan Oblast, a village in Rizhsky Selsoviet of Shumikhinsky District;

Moscow Oblast
As of 2014, six rural localities in Moscow Oblast bear this name:

Nazarovo, Bolsherogachevskoye Rural Settlement, Dmitrovsky District, Moscow Oblast, a village in Bolsherogachevskoye Rural Settlement of Dmitrovsky District; 
Nazarovo, Kulikovskoye Rural Settlement, Dmitrovsky District, Moscow Oblast, a village in Kulikovskoye Rural Settlement of Dmitrovsky District; 
Nazarovo, Istrinsky District, Moscow Oblast, a village in Yadrominskoye Rural Settlement of Istrinsky District; 
Nazarovo, Pushkinsky District, Moscow Oblast, a village in Tsarevskoye Rural Settlement of Pushkinsky District; 
Nazarovo, Stupinsky District, Moscow Oblast, a village in Semenovskoye Rural Settlement of Stupinsky District; 
Nazarovo, Yegoryevsky District, Moscow Oblast, a village under the administrative jurisdiction of the Town of Yegoryevsk in Yegoryevsky District;

Nizhny Novgorod Oblast
As of 2014, one rural locality in Nizhny Novgorod Oblast bears this name:

Nazarovo, Nizhny Novgorod Oblast, a village in Khmelevitsky Selsoviet under the administrative jurisdiction of the town of oblast significance of Shakhunya;

Novosibirsk Oblast
As of 2014, one rural locality in Novosibirsk Oblast bears this name:

Nazarovo, Novosibirsk Oblast, a selo in Kuybyshevsky District;

Perm Krai
As of 2014, one rural locality in Perm Krai bears this name:
Nazarovo, Perm Krai, a village in Permsky District

Ryazan Oblast
As of 2014, one rural locality in Ryazan Oblast bears this name:
Nazarovo, Ryazan Oblast, a village in Pustynsky Rural Okrug of Kasimovsky District

Sverdlovsk Oblast
As of 2014, one rural locality in Sverdlovsk Oblast bears this name:
Nazarovo, Sverdlovsk Oblast, a selo in Nazarovsky Selsoviet of Turinsky District

Tver Oblast
As of 2014, four rural localities in Tver Oblast bear this name:
Nazarovo, Kimrsky District, Tver Oblast, a village in Neklyudovskoye Rural Settlement of Kimrsky District
Nazarovo, Sosnovitskoye Rural Settlement, Likhoslavlsky District, Tver Oblast, a village in Sosnovitskoye Rural Settlement of Likhoslavlsky District
Nazarovo, Tolmachevskoye Rural Settlement, Likhoslavlsky District, Tver Oblast, a village in Tolmachevskoye Rural Settlement of Likhoslavlsky District
Nazarovo, Oleninsky District, Tver Oblast, a village in Glazkovskoye Rural Settlement of Oleninsky District

Tyumen Oblast
As of 2014, one rural locality in Tyumen Oblast bears this name:
Nazarovo, Tyumen Oblast, a selo in Nazarovsky Rural Okrug of Abatsky District

Vladimir Oblast
As of 2014, three rural localities in Vladimir Oblast bear this name:
Nazarovo, Kameshkovsky District, Vladimir Oblast, a village in Kameshkovsky District
Nazarovo, Petushinsky District, Vladimir Oblast, a village in Petushinsky District
Nazarovo, Sobinsky District, Vladimir Oblast, a village in Sobinsky District

Vologda Oblast
As of 2014, three rural localities in Vologda Oblast bear this name:
Nazarovo, Babayevsky District, Vologda Oblast, a village in Novostarinsky Selsoviet of Babayevsky District
Nazarovo, Sheksninsky District, Vologda Oblast, a village in Charomsky Selsoviet of Sheksninsky District
Nazarovo, Vologodsky District, Vologda Oblast, a village in Leskovsky Selsoviet of Vologodsky District

Yaroslavl Oblast
As of 2014, seven rural localities in Yaroslavl Oblast bear this name:
Nazarovo, Ryzhikovsky Rural Okrug, Danilovsky District, Yaroslavl Oblast, a village in Ryzhikovsky Rural Okrug of Danilovsky District
Nazarovo, Semivragovsky Rural Okrug, Danilovsky District, Yaroslavl Oblast, a village in Semivragovsky Rural Okrug of Danilovsky District
Nazarovo, Lyubimsky District, Yaroslavl Oblast, a village in Lyubimsky Rural Okrug of Lyubimsky District
Nazarovo, Nekouzsky District, Yaroslavl Oblast, a village in Stanilovsky Rural Okrug of Nekouzsky District
Nazarovo, Poshekhonsky District, Yaroslavl Oblast, a village in Priukhrinsky Rural Okrug of Poshekhonsky District
Nazarovo, Rybinsky District, Yaroslavl Oblast, a village in Nazarovsky Rural Okrug of Rybinsky District
Nazarovo, Tutayevsky District, Yaroslavl Oblast, a village in Nikolsky Rural Okrug of Tutayevsky District

Abolished localities
Nazarovo, Irkutsk Oblast, a selo in Ust-Kutsky District of Irkutsk Oblast; abolished in June 2015; 
Nazarovo, Khabarovsk Krai, a rural locality classified as an electric utility post in Ayano-Maysky District of Khabarovsk Krai; abolished in August 2011